Richard "Dixie" McNeil (born 16 January 1947) is an English former footballer and manager, who played as a striker.

Playing career
As a schoolboy, McNeil signed for Leicester City after playing for the local club Holwell Works, but he was released without playing for the first team. He made his Football League debut for Exeter City in the 1966-67 season against Wrexham, a club he would later play for and manage. Despite scoring in one third of the matches he played, he was released at the end of the season, dropping down into the Southern League with Corby Town, who were relegated in McNeil's first season. Northampton Town then bought him for £5,000 in May 1969.

McNeil spent two and a half seasons at Northampton, scoring in the FA Cup match against Manchester United in which George Best scored six times. He then joined fellow Fourth Division side Lincoln City. He would be the top scorer at a club for the next five seasons, twice at Lincoln and three times at Hereford United after a £15,000 transfer. He helped Hereford achieve promotion to the Second Division of English football in 1975-76. He was also the top goalscorer of the top four divisions of English football that season. Hereford finished bottom of the Second Division the following season despite McNeil scoring nearly a goal every other game.

In 1977, McNeil moved to Wrexham for £60,000. He scored the equaliser at the Racecourse Ground against Blyth Spartans, which took the club to an FA Cup replay at St James' Park, where he scored the winning goal. He retired from professional football in 1983 but played on in the Welsh National League with Chirk AAA, and also made an appearance in the FA Cup in 1985, at the age of 38.

Management career
McNeil became Wrexham manager in 1985 winning the Welsh Cup and progressing to the European Cup Winners' Cup in his first season.

After a spell as assistant manager at Coventry City, McNeil became a sales representative with Marston's Brewery, as well as reporting on Wrexham's games for local radio. In November 1993 he returned to football management as manager of League of Wales side Flint Town United, leading them from near relegation certainties to finish the season in fourth position. He was awarded a testimonial by Wrexham, against Kevin Keegan's Premier League side, Newcastle United in 1994.

McNeil returned to management in January 2000 as manager of struggling League of Wales side Caernarfon Town. His first win with Caernarfon was to beat Swansea City in the FAW Premier Cup quarter-final. He later became manager of another League of Wales club, Cefn Druids.

External links
 BBC Wales Hall of Fame
 Interview with McNeil
 football-england.com biography

1947 births
Living people
Sportspeople from Melton Mowbray
Footballers from Leicestershire
English footballers
Association football forwards
Holwell Sports F.C. players
Leicester City F.C. players
Exeter City F.C. players
Corby Town F.C. players
Northampton Town F.C. players
Lincoln City F.C. players
Hereford United F.C. players
Wrexham A.F.C. players
Chirk AAA F.C. players
English Football League players
Southern Football League players
English football managers
Wrexham A.F.C. managers
Flint Town United F.C. managers
Caernarfon Town F.C. managers
Cefn Druids A.F.C. managers
Coventry City F.C. non-playing staff 
Hereford United F.C. non-playing staff